Ayer Paabas is a town and mukim in Alor Gajah District, Malacca, Malaysia.

Education
 University College of Agroscience Malaysia (UCAM)

References

Towns in Malacca